Hagiotherapy is the medieval practice of using religious relics, prayers, pilgrimages, etc. to alleviate sickness. It was used to treat epilepsy during the Middle Ages with Saint Valentine particularly associated with the treatment as an 'epilepsy specialist'.

Tomislav Ivančić 

A known practicing therapist is Tomislav Ivančić, who founded Center for Spiritual Help in Zagreb. Prokop Remeš in the Czech Republic is treating addicts in Bohnice Psychiatric Hospital in Prague. His style of hagiotherapy is a type of group existential psychotherapy (Yalom, Frankl), which focuses on eliminating dysfunctional behaviour patterns from one's life. This hagiotherapy uses biblical text as background to project one's own experiences against to active a greater understanding of text: one of the main instruments of hagiotherapy is projective work with biblical texts.

Ivančić recently defined hagiotherapy as a scientific discipline which aims to heal the human soul. His thesis was that every human being does not have only physical and psychological dimension, but also spiritual dimension (human soul) that has its own scientific laws and it should be subject of scientific research.

One of examples Ivančić gives is addiction. He was concerned with the fact that so many patients relapse some time after treatment. He explained it with the fact that they were treated only on mental level, and not on spiritual level. According to his opinion, addiction is basically spiritual issue, so it needs to be treated on spiritual level.

References

Supernatural healing
Psychotherapies
History of medicine
Science in the Middle Ages